Natatolana brucei is a species of crustacean in the family Cirolanidae, and was first described by Stephen John Keable in 2006. The species epithet, brucei, nonours Neil L. Bruce.

It is a benthic species, living at depths of 10 - 40 m in subtropical waters, along the east coast of Australia. It is a scavenger.

References

External links
Natatolana brucei occurrence data from GBIF

Cymothoida
Crustaceans of Australia
Crustaceans described in 2006
Taxa named by Stephen John Keable